Sebastian Siedler (born 18 January 1978 in Leipzig) is a former racing cyclist from Germany, who last rode for UCI Continental team . He had a successful track career prior to turning to road bicycle racing, winning Team Pursuit at the 2000 UCI Track Cycling World Championships in Manchester. He turned professional in 2004 with Team Wiesenhof, and spent two seasons there before moving to Team Milram for two seasons. Siedler joined  at the start of the 2009 season. He rode in the 2006 Vuelta a España, finishing 127th overall.

Major results 

2001
 1st Stage 3 Brandenburg–Rundfahrt
 3rd Stausee-Rundfahrt Klingnau
 6th Rund um die Hainleite-Erfurt
2002
 1st Stage 2 Hessen Rundfahrt
 1st Stage 3 Cinturón a Mallorca
2003
 1st Stages 4, 6 & 7 Tour de Serbie
 1st Stages 2 & 6 Tour du Loir-et-Cher
2004
 1st Rund um die Nürnberger Altstadt
 1st Stage 5 Hessen Rundfahrt
 1st Stage 3 Peace Race
 4th Stausee-Rundfahrt Klingnau
 4th Trofeo Cala Millor-Cala Bona
 7th Overall Istrian Spring Trophy
2005
 5th Schaal Sels
2007
 6th Overall Bayern Rundfahrt
1st Stage 5
 7th Overall Sachsen-Tour
2008
 1st Stage 1 Tour de Picardie
 10th Overall Tour of Qatar
2009
 1st Stage 8 Tour of Turkey
 1st Stage 6 Post Danmark Rundt
 3rd Neuseen Classics
 8th Châteauroux Classic

External links
 

1978 births
Living people
German male cyclists
Sportspeople from Leipzig
Presidential Cycling Tour of Turkey stage winners
UCI Track Cycling World Champions (men)
German track cyclists
People from Bezirk Leipzig
Cyclists from Saxony